John Thomas Driscoll (October 26, 1925 -  March 11, 2019) was a former American politician who served as a member of the Massachusetts House of Representatives from 1955 to 1960, Treasurer and Receiver-General of Massachusetts from 1961 to 1964, chairman of the Massachusetts Turnpike Authority from 1964 to 1987, and Vice President for Administration at Boston College from 1987 to 1997.

During his tenure as treasurer, he defeated three different candidates named John Kennedy. He defeated John B. Kennedy and John M. Kennedy in the 1960 Democratic primary  and John Francis Kennedy and John M. Kennedy in the 1962 primary.

See also
 1955–1956 Massachusetts legislature

References

1925 births
Boston College alumni
Boston College faculty
2019 deaths
Democratic Party members of the Massachusetts House of Representatives
Politicians from Boston
State treasurers of Massachusetts